Tweel is an airless tire design concept developed by the French tire company Michelin.

Tweel  may also refer to:

Tweel (A Martian Odyssey), a creature in Stanley G. Weinbaum's short story
Jeff Tweel, songwriter: see :Category:Songs written by Jeff Tweel